Joox (stylised as JOOX) is a music streaming service owned by Tencent, launched in January 2015. Joox is the biggest music streaming app in Asian markets such as Hong Kong, Macau, Indonesia, Malaysia, Myanmar, Thailand and also the South African market. Joox is a freemium service, providing most of its songs free, while some songs are only available for premium users, offered via paid subscriptions or by doing different tasks offered.

In 2017, Joox launched their service in South Africa, their first non-Asian market. The service now accounts for more than 50% of all music streaming app downloads in their Asian markets. The number of music-streaming users in Hong Kong, Macau, Malaysia, Thailand, Myanmar and Indonesia was expected to reach 87 million by 2020.

Background 
Before the emergence of Joox, Tencent owned QQ Music, one of the largest music streaming and download service in China. In 2015, they introduced Joox as their expansion of music services to overseas market instead of Mainland China, starting first in Hong Kong.

Instead of providing free services by playing audio ads to users like Spotify, another major music service, Joox focused on banner ads, splash ads and other advertising methods such as category playlists and in-app skins. They claimed it as a success. Joox offered their premium VIP access to DStv subscribers free of charge. DStv is the sister company to Tencent and is the primary pay-TV provider in South Africa. In November 2021, it was announced that Joox will stop streaming in South Africa in March 2022.

See also 
 QQ Music - Tencent's China market music service

References

Tencent
Music streaming services
2015 software
2015 establishments in China
2015 establishments in Hong Kong
Chinese brands
Mobile applications